Prospect Creek is the name of the following:

Communities
In the United States
Prospect Creek, Alaska, site of the coldest US temperature observation (-80 °F)

Watercourses
In the United States
Prospect Creek, Montana
Prospect Creek, Washington

In Australia
Prospect Creek (New South Wales)
Prospect Creek (Victoria)
Prospect Creek (Western Australia)